O6 or O-6 may refer to:
 LNER Class O6, a class of British steam locomotives 
 O6 star, a subclass of O-class stars
 OceanAir IATA airline designator
 O-6, a pay grade in the US uniformed services:
 Colonel in the Army, Marine Corps, Air Force, and Space Force
 Captain in the Navy, Coast Guard, Public Health Service Commissioned Corps, and NOAA Commissioned Officer Corps
 the "Occupied 6", an Irish republican euphemism for Northern Ireland
 USS O-6 (SS-67), an O-class submarine of the United States Navy

See also
 06 (disambiguation)